Volleyball is a sport played all over India, both in rural as well as urban India. It is a popular recreation sport. India was ranked 5th in Asia, and 27th in the world in 2013. Doing well in the youth and junior levels,  in second in the 2003 World Youth Championships. Currently, a major problem for the sport is the lack of sponsors. The Indian senior men's team is currently ranked 78th in the world.

A league named has been started in India for volleyball with six teams participating in four round robin format at two different venues (Chennai, and Kochi). It is called Pro Volleyball League. The teams come from Chennai, Hyderabad, Mumbai, Ahmedabad, Calicut and Kochi.

See also
India men's national volleyball team
India women's national volleyball team
Volleyball Federation of India

References

External links
 Volleyball Federation of India